Benkt-Åke Benktsson (6 January 1907 – 8 January 1957) was a Swedish film actor. He was born in Halmstad, Sweden and died in Malmö, Sweden.

Filmography

References

External links

1907 births
1957 deaths
Actors from Halmstad
20th-century Swedish male actors